Glen Hubert Moulder (September 28, 1917 – November 27, 1994) was an American Major League Baseball pitcher with the Brooklyn Dodgers (1946), St. Louis Browns (1947) and Chicago White Sox (1948). Moulder batted and threw right-handed. He was born in Cleveland, Oklahoma.

External links

1917 births
1994 deaths
People from Cleveland, Oklahoma
Major League Baseball pitchers
Brooklyn Dodgers players
Chicago White Sox players
St. Louis Browns players
Americus Pioneers players
Beatrice Blues players
Charleston Senators players
Columbus Red Birds players
Dayton Wings players
Durham Bulls players
Hollywood Stars players
Montreal Royals players
Olean Oilers players
Rochester Red Wings players
Toledo Mud Hens players
Baseball players from Oklahoma